Robin Weisman is a former American child actress. She is well known as the "little lady" Mary Bennington in the 1990 film Three Men and a Little Lady co-starring Tom Selleck, Steve Guttenberg and Ted Danson.

Weisman was born in Hollywood, Florida to parents Betsy and David Weisman and acted between 1990 and 1994. Following Three Men and a Little Lady, she made an appearance on Wogan in 1991. She also appeared in Keys with Marg Helgenberger and Thunder in Paradise with Hulk Hogan. She left Thunder in Paradise after three episodes and was replaced in the role by Ashley Gorrell.

As an adult, Weisman gained a degree in business studies from the University of Florida. She married her childhood sweetheart John Kabot in a Jewish ceremony on December 20, 2008. They lived in Plantation, Florida, near Weisman's home town of Fort Lauderdale until their divorce in 2011. , Robin was working in marketing.

Robin is the older sister of Broadway actor Alex Weisman.

References

External links
 

20th-century American actresses
Actresses from Florida
American child actresses
American film actresses
American television actresses
Living people
People from Hollywood, Florida
University of Florida alumni
People from Plantation, Florida
21st-century American women
Year of birth missing (living people)